Cameron Park is a census-designated place (CDP) in El Dorado County, California, United States and is part of the Greater Sacramento Area. The population was 19,171 in the 2020 census, up from 18,228 in 2010. Cameron Park is a community located in the Northern California Gold Country of the Sierra Nevada foothills, approximately 30 miles (50 km) east of Sacramento and 70 miles (110 km) west of South Lake Tahoe.

History
The original Native American inhabitants of the area surrounding Cameron Park were Nisenan, or Southern Maidu Indians. Grinding rocks and burial mounds serve as glimpses of the past and are still visible in various locations in and near Cameron Park.

Modern development accelerated in the area when Larry Cameron purchased  of foothill land in the 1950s for development purposes, first for ranching, then involving housing, a golf course, parks, a lake and a small airport. In the years since then, the land has slowly been sub-divided into lots of varying sizes, including ranch-sized properties and medium and high density residential neighborhoods. Today, Cameron Park contains a mix of ranches, single family homes, condominiums, apartments and businesses. As of the 2020 Census, the Cameron Park CDP had 7,748 housing units.

Geography and climate

Cameron Park is situated in an interior chaparral zone or brush zone just east of the Central Valley. It is the closest population center to the Pine Hill Ecological Reserve. Native vegetation includes an abundance of redbud and manzanita bushes, and brush in general. Where treed the native trees are primarily gray pines, and oak trees with some small groves of ponderosa pines starting in the higher elevation zones.

Summers are generally hot and dry, with average daytime temperatures in the  range, but sometimes reaching , or more. It can be very dry, with little effect of mountain thunderstorms or monsoonal flows that affect the south and interiors. Nights, however, tend to cool off more so than in the Sacramento Valley below, and temperatures in general range a few degrees below the eastern portion of the Central Valley because of the elevation difference. Autumns tend to be an "extended dry, hot summer" throughout California and Cameron Park is no exception. Winters are generally cool and rainy, with highs averaging  and nights occasionally dropping below freezing. Cameron Park typically receives exceptional snow events, about once every few years.

The soil in Cameron Park is reddish and clay-like and usually must be amended in order for many non-native ornamental plants to survive. The soil is derived from Gabbro type of volcanic bedrock and despite its clay-like composition it is good soil and rich in nutrients. Cameron Park is in Sunset Climate Zone 9 and USDA Plant Hardiness Zone 9A.

Demographics

2020
At the 2020 census Cameron Park had a population of 19,171. The racial makeup of Cameron Park was 16,242 (88.2%) White, 143 (0.9%) African American, 194 (1.1%) Native American, 425 (2.3%) Asian, 36 (0.2%) Pacific Islander, 461 (2.5%) from other races, and 727 (4.0%) from two or more races. Hispanic or Latino of any race were 17% of the population .

The age distribution was 4.4% were under 5 years, 79% were over 18 years of age, and 23% were 65 years or older. The median age was 45.3 years.

There were 7,748 housing units reported with a margin of error of 260.

The median income reported was $79,814, with a margin of error of $5,265.

2010
At the 2010 census Cameron Park had a population of 18,228. The racial makeup of Cameron Park was 16,242 (89.1%) White, 143 (0.8%) African American, 194 (1.1%) Native American, 425 (2.3%) Asian, 36 (0.2%) Pacific Islander, 461 (2.5%) from other races, and 727 (4.0%) from two or more races. Hispanic or Latino of any race were 2,056 persons (11.3%).

The census reported that 18,222 people (100% of the population) lived in households, 6 (0%) lived in non-institutionalized group quarters, and no one was institutionalized. 2,512 (35.9%) households had children under the age of 18 living with them, 3,975 (56.8%) were opposite-sex married couples living together, 790 (11.3%) had a female householder with no husband present, 356 (5.1%) had a male householder with no wife present. There were 390 (5.6%) unmarried opposite-sex partnerships, and 41 (0.6%) same-sex married couples or partnerships. 1,465 households (20.9%) were one person and 622 (8.9%) had someone living alone who was 65 or older. The average household size was 2.61. There were 5,121 families (73.2% of households); the average family size was 3.00.

The age distribution was 4,576 people (25.1%) under the age of 18, 1,502 people (8.2%) aged 18 to 24, 4,162 people (22.8%) aged 25 to 44, 5,358 people (29.4%) aged 45 to 64, and 2,630 people (14.4%) who were 65 or older. The median age was 40.6 years. For every 100 females, there were 94.3 males. For every 100 females age 18 and over, there were 92.1 males.

The homeowner vacancy rate was 2.0%; the rental vacancy rate was 14.6%. 12,566 people (68.9% of the population) lived in owner-occupied housing units and 5,656 people (31.0%) lived in rental housing units.

Government

Locally, a Community Services District (CSD), supported by an elected Board of Directors, provides many programs and services such as fire and emergency services, local administration, CC&R enforcement, recreational programs and parks and facilities management and upkeep.

Sites of interest

Cameron Airpark Estate's wide streets double as taxiways leading from the residences to the adjacent airport. Many homes have aircraft hangars (oversized garages) that house personal aircraft, allowing residents to commute from home to work entirely by air. The adjoining airport (Cameron Airpark, O61) is a public airport and of economic importance to the surrounding region.

Adjacent to the Airpark Estates sits man-made Cameron Park Lake. Turtles and aquatic fowl can be seen at the lake, and the Community Services District regularly stocks the lake with fish including bluegill, black bass, and black crappie fish. Cameron Park Lake is also the site of the annual "Summer Spectacular" held on or about the Independence Day holiday. Since 1999 this event has provided entertainment, food, and a fireworks show to attendees. Cameron Park Lake is also the home of "Ribstock," a one-day barbecue festival that features a Kansas City Barbeque Society-sanctioned barbecue competition.

Cameron Park was once known as the home of "Sam's Town", where many travelers stopped on their way to and from Lake Tahoe. This restaurant and amusement complex was located along Highway 50, but was torn down in 2002 and is now a "ForkLift Grocery" store, part of the Nugget Markets chain. All that remains is a plaque noting its former existence.

Parts of the Skinner Vineyard and Winery from the early 1860s can be seen at the intersection of Green Valley Road and Cameron Park Drive. All that is left of Skinner's ranch is a portion of the cellar (integrated into the Cameron Park Nursery on the northeast corner of the intersection), a tiny remnant of the distillery wall (behind mobile homes in the mobile home park near the southeast corner of the intersection), and the Skinner cemetery (near the south-west corner of the intersection). The cemetery contains the graves of James and Jessie Skinner (née Bernard) and three of their sons. The cemetery is located on a small hill just west of the intersection behind a pizza restaurant. Only remnants of a few headstones and fence remain due to the effects of time and vandalism. There are several other "pioneer" cemeteries located throughout Cameron Park.

El Dorado Community Health Center (EDCHC) is a Federally Qualified Health Center 501(c)(3) with a wide range of services in Cameron Park, CA, including; General Health, Dental Services, Pharmacy, Prevention & Wellness, Immunizations, Behavioral Health, Podiatry and Flu/Pneumonia Immunization.

Parks 
Cameron Park has several family friendly parks, several of which that include baseball and soccer fields, where little league tournament events are held seasonally, one of the most notable locations is Rasmussen Park, nearby the airport and its surrounding communities. Rasmussen Park features a small bridge spanning a small brook, a mile long track for walking and jogging, two separate playgrounds, two baseball fields, and a soccer field on site. Other amenities include access to a series of trails that lead to a small pond nearby which is home to several species of Bass (fish), Bluefill, Perch, and Swans among other types of fauna.

References

External links
 Chamber of Commerce
 Community Services District
 Cameron Park Country Club
 El Dorado Community Health Center (EDCHC)
 Ribstock BBQ Festival
 Summer Spectacular
 Foothill Cruiser Car Show
 Run with Santa

Census-designated places in El Dorado County, California
Census-designated places in California